

Arnisee is a reservoir in the Canton of Uri, Switzerland. It can be reached by gondola lift from Amsteg and Intschi.

See also
List of mountain lakes of Switzerland

Lakes of the canton of Uri
Reservoirs in Switzerland